The Seven Tasks of Ali Baba (Italian: Le 7 fatiche di Alì Babà) is a 1962 Italian adventure film directed by Emimmo Salvi and featuring Bella Cortez, Salvatore Furnari and Iloosh Khoshabe in lead roles.

References

External links

1962 films
1960s Italian-language films
Italian adventure films
1962 adventure films
Peplum films
Sword and sandal films
1960s Italian films